The 2018 Rink Hockey Female European Championship was the 14th edition of this tournament, held between 8 and 14 October 2018 in Mealhada, Portugal. The competition was contested by seven teams under a round-robin format.

Controversies 
The final match between Portugal and Spain was suspended with less than two minutes left, due to the effects of Ex-Hurricane Leslie. Spain was winning by 3–2. As such, the assignation of the champion was suspended.

Finally, the last two minutes were played on 1 November 2018 and Spain achieved the title with one more goal, finally winning by 4–2.

League table

Matches

Day 1

Day 2

Day 3

Day 4

Day 5

Day 6

Final ranking

References

External links
World Skate Europe website

European Women's Roller Hockey Championship
European Championship
Euro
International roller hockey competitions hosted by Portugal
Euro